Christopher Columba Fletcher (born 14 June 1933) is an Irish retired professional footballer who played as a forward in the Scottish League for Kilmarnock and Morton. He also played in the Football League for Brentford.

Career statistics

References

External links

1933 births
Republic of Ireland association footballers
English Football League players
Brentford F.C. players
Living people
People from Buncrana
Association football outside forwards
Kilmarnock F.C. players
Scottish Football League players
Cheltenham Town F.C. players
Southend United F.C. players
Peterborough United F.C. players
Greenock Morton F.C. players
Berwick Rangers F.C. players
East Fife F.C. players
Southern Football League players
Irish expatriate sportspeople in England
Irish expatriate sportspeople in Scotland
Republic of Ireland expatriate association footballers
Midland Football League players